Volodymyr Petrovich Bondarenko (born 6 July 1981) is a Ukrainian footballer and coach.

Player career
Pupil of Dynamo Sports School (Kyiv). The first coach was OV Leonidov. He played for the following teams: CSKA-2 (Kyiv), Sistema-Borex (Boyarka), CSKA Kyiv, Arsenal Kyiv, Lisma-Mordovia Saransk, Sokol-Saratov, Obolon Kyiv, Sodovik (Sterlitamak), Baltika Kaliningrad, Dynamo Saint Petersburg, Torpedo Moscow. The latter left the club in July 2012 on charges of contract matches brought against him by the club. In the summer of 2012 he moved to Oleksandriya. He took 81 numbers in the team. In the 2012/13 season, he and his team became a bronze medalist, the club lost only to Alchevsk "Steel" and "Sevastopol". Bondarenko played in 26 matches. In 2015 he played for the then amateur team Dinaz Vyshhorod, and in 2016 he became the playing coach of the team Desna Pogreby.

Coach career
In 2018 he become the coach of Dinaz Vyshhorod. In the 2020–21 he achieve asecond place Ukrainian Second League. In the season 2021–22 he has been elected best coach of the round 4 Ukrainian Second League.

Honours
Desna Pogreby
 Football cup of Kyiv Oblast: 2017

Dinaz Vyshhorod
 Football cup of Kyiv Oblast: 2015

Ukraine U-18
 2000 Finalist

Ukraine U-20
 FIFA World Youth Championship
 2001 participant

Dinaz Vyshhorod
 Ukrainian Second League: Runner-Up 2020–21

Individual
 Best Coach Round 4 Ukrainian Second League: 2021–22

See also
 2001 FIFA World Youth Championship squads#Ukraine

References

External links
Player page on the official FC Baltika Kaliningrad website 

1981 births
Living people
Footballers from Kyiv
Ukrainian footballers
Ukraine youth international footballers
Ukraine student international footballers
Ukrainian expatriate footballers
Ukrainian Premier League players
FC Arsenal Kyiv players
FC Baltika Kaliningrad players
FC Volyn Lutsk players
FC Obolon-Brovar Kyiv players
FC Sokol Saratov players
FC Chornomorets Odesa players
Expatriate footballers in Russia
FC Sodovik Sterlitamak players
FC Torpedo Moscow players
FC Mordovia Saransk players
FC Oleksandriya players
FC Dinaz Vyshhorod players
FC Desna Pohreby players
Association football midfielders
FC Dynamo Saint Petersburg players
Ukrainian football managers
FC Dinaz Vyshhorod managers